Hans Grimm (1905–1998) was a German film director.

Selected filmography
 Fanfare of Marriage (1953)
 My Father, the Actor (1956)
 Do Not Send Your Wife to Italy (1960)
 Isola Bella (1961)
 Darling (1961)

References

Bibliography
 Sabine Schrader & Daniel Winkler. The Cinemas of Italian Migration: European and Transatlantic Narratives. Cambridge Scholars Publishing, 2014.

External links

1905 births
1998 deaths
Film directors from Bavaria
People from Rehau